The hispid pocket gopher (Heterogeomys hispidus) is a species of rodent in the family Geomyidae. It is found in Mexico, Belize, Guatemala, and Honduras. Some authors classify it in the genus Orthogeomys, but recent research has allowed this and its related species to be classified in the genus Heterogeomys.

References

Hispid pocket gopher
Mammals of Mexico
Rodents of Central America
Rodents of North America
Mammals described in 1852
Least concern biota of North America
Taxonomy articles created by Polbot